Tulkarm Camp (Arabic: مخيم طولكرم), is a Palestinian refugee camp north of the West Bank in the city of Tulkarm, established in 1950 on 0.18 km2 by the UNRWA. It is the second largest refugee camp in the West Bank, as well as one of the most densely populated. The camp was severely affected during the Second Intifada by incursions, arrests, raids and curfews. Incursions still take place, though on a more irregular basis. In 2013, the health centre was reconstructed with project funds amounting to US$1.7 million. Tulkarm camp has four UNRWA schools.

History 
Most of the refugees who resided in the camp came from Jaffa, Caesarea and Haifa. Today it is the second largest Palestinian refugee camp in the West Bank.

During the early months of First Intifada on 26 April 1989 Izam Omar Hasan, aged 8, was shot dead by Israeli soldiers. On the same day Samar Muhammad Manid, aged 9, was shot in the eye with a plastic bullet. He died 5 days later. In March 1990, responding to questions from a member of Knesset, Minister of Defence Yitzak Rabin stated the army was active in Tulkarm at the time of the deaths and that in the case of the 9-year old the Military Police Investigation was continuing; in the case of the 8-year-old an officer was reprimanded for firing five plastic bullets breaking operational orders, but it could not be established if he killed the boy because no autopsy was carried out.
On 31 May Muhammad Hamadan, aged 8 months, was shot dead by soldiers while being carried by his mother in Tulkarm refugee camp.

References 

Populated places established in 1950
Palestinian refugee camps in the West Bank
Tulkarm Governorate